The 1993–94 Purdue Boilermakers men's basketball team represented Purdue University as a member of the Big Ten Conference during the 1993–94 NCAA Division I men's basketball season. The team was led by Gene Keady and played its home games at Mackey Arena.

Roster

Schedule and results

|-
!colspan=9 style=| Regular Season

|-
!colspan=9 style=| NCAA tournament

NCAA tournament
During the 1994 NCAA Division I men's basketball tournament, Purdue qualified for the Elite Eight, where they lost to the Duke Blue Devils.

Southeast
Purdue (#1 seed) 98, Central Florida (#16 seed) 67
Purdue 83, Alabama (#9 seed) 73
Purdue 83, Kansas (#4 seed) 78
Duke (#2 seed) 69, Purdue 60

Player stats

Awards and honors
 Glenn Robinson, Adolph Rupp Trophy
 Glenn Robinson, Chicago Tribune Silver Basketball
 Glenn Robinson, Naismith College Player of the Year
 Glenn Robinson, USBWA College Player of the Year
 Glenn Robinson, John R. Wooden Award
 Glenn Robinson, Associated Press College Basketball Player of the Year
 Glenn Robinson, State Farm Division I Player of the Year Award

Rankings

Team players drafted into the NBA

See also
1994 NCAA Division I men's basketball tournament
List of NCAA Division I institutions

References

Purdue Boilermarkers
Purdue Boilermakers men's basketball seasons
Purd
Purd
Purdue